The July 5 Album is the second compilation album by American pop group The 5th Dimension, released in 1970 by Soul City. It is composed primarily of album tracks from amongst the group's four albums of original material for Soul City Records, many of which were B-sides to charting singles  It also includes the A-side single: a cover of the Mamas & the Papas hit "Go Where You Wanna Go". Choosing that single, and seeing it become successful, became something of a mixed blessing for The 5th Dimension, as they were frequently referred to in the media as "The Black Mamas & the Papas", a label the group sought to escape while creating their own unique identity.

The July 5 Album was the final album release for Soul City Records' distribution deal with Liberty Records. The 5th Dimension subsequently signed with Bell Records.

Released on August 15, 1970, just three months after their prior Greatest Hits (Soul City) album, The July 5 Album peaked at No. 63 on Billboard Magazine's Top 200 albums chart.

In the second week of its release, The July 5 Album was one of four albums by the 5th Dimension in the top 100 of Billboard's albums chart: Greatest Hits (Soul City) was at No. 23, The Age of Aquarius – from which four of The July 5 Album'''s tracks were pulled – sat at No. 98, and Portrait'' appeared at No. 64.

Track listing

Charts

Personnel
Marilyn McCoo – vocals
Florence LaRue – vocals
Billy Davis, Jr. – vocals
Lamonte McLemore – vocals
Ron Townson – vocals

References

The 5th Dimension albums
1970 compilation albums